Owen Caech Ó Dubhda (died 1495) was Chief of the Name and Lord of Tireragh.

Owen Caech was the son of a Ruaidhrí Ó Dubhda, though probably not the man who died as king in 1380. The Annals of the Four Masters name him as Owen Caech, the son of Rory O'Dowda, Lord of Tireragh. The contemporary Annals of Ulster list him as Ua Dubda, namely, Eogan Blindeye, son of Ruaidhri Ua Dubda.

External links
 http://www.ucc.ie/celt/published/T100005C/index.html

Medieval Gaels from Ireland
People from County Mayo
People from County Sligo
15th-century Irish people
15th-century births
Year of birth missing
1495 deaths
People of the Tudor period
Irish lords